The World Junior Alpine Skiing Championships 2008 were the 27th World Junior Alpine Skiing Championships, held between 23–29 February 2008 in Formigal, Spain.

Medal winners

Men's events

Two bronze medals were awarded in the Slalom.

Women's events

External links
World Junior Alpine Skiing Championships 2008 results at fis-ski.com

World Junior Alpine Skiing Championships
2008 in alpine skiing
Alpine skiing competitions in Spain
2008 in Spanish sport